Mediology (French: médiologie) broadly indicates a wide-ranging method for the analysis of cultural transmission in society and across societies, a method which challenges the conventional idea that 'technology is not culture'. The mediological method pays specific attention to the role of organisations and technical innovations, and the ways in which these can ensure the potency of cultural transmission - and thus the transformation of ideas into a civilisational worldview capable of sustained action.

Overview
The term was first coined and introduced in French as "médiologie" by the French intellectual Régis Debray in the "Teachers, Writers, Celebrities" section of his book Le pouvoir intellectuel en France, (Editions Ramsay, 1979). The English form of the term became more widely known and respected in the English-speaking world with the publication of the key text on mediology in English, Debray's Transmitting Culture (University of Columbia Press, 2004). Mediology was taught for the first time in the Sorbonne (Paris) in 2007.

The practice of mediology is not a science, and thus is able to range across academic disciplines. The main areas involved are those of longitudinal history (the history of technologies, the history of the book, the histories and theories of aesthetics) and also research in communications and information theory.

Mediology is not a narrow specialist area of contemporary academic knowledge (as media sociology is), nor does it aspire to be a precise science of signs (as semiotics does). It differs from the models put forward by communication studies, in that its focus is not isolated individuals and a fleeting few moments of communication. Instead mediologists study the cultural transmission of religions, ideologies, the arts and political ideas in society, and across societies, over a time period that is usually to be measured in months, decades or millennia. Debray argues that mediology "would like to bring to light the function of medium in all its forms, over a long time span - since the birth of writing. And without becoming obsessed by today's media."

Mediology must thus closely examine the methods used for the memorising, transmission, and displacement of cultural knowledge in any milieu. But it must balance its understanding of these with an equally close study of our individual modes of belief, thoughts, and competing social organisations. Mediology must further understand that such transmission is not simply happening within a lofty linguistic or textual discourse, but that transmission takes an equally valid concrete form in which "material technologies and symbolic forms" combine to produce things such as rituals, architecture, flags, special sites, customs, typefaces and book bindings, smells and sounds, bodily gestures and postures, all of which have a potent anchoring role in cultural transmission among ordinary people.

Debray further points to the need to consider the role in transmission of all manner of non-media technical-cultural inventions, especially those of new forms of transportation. He gives the historical example of the bicycle, which he suggests was historically associated with: the rise of a democratic rational individualism; a new role for women in advanced societies; and the new kinetic ideas expressed in early modernist art and cinema.

A mediologist might thus make an examination "within a system" (e.g. of systems of book production, of authors and publishers), or of "the interaction between systems" (e.g. how painting and early photography influenced each other), or even of "the interactions across systems" (e.g. the ways in which symbolic transmission of systematic knowledge is brought to intersect with the material history of actual transportation - such as desert trading routes and ancient religion, telegraph and railroad, the radio and airplanes, television and satellites, mobile phones and cars).

Debray is generally critical of some of the ideas of Marshall McLuhan (whom he sees as being overly technologically determinist), and of the French sociologist Pierre Bourdieu. He also tries to step beyond Antonio Gramsci, in that he suggests that an ideology cannot be comprehended in ideological terms alone.

Criticisms
Criticisms of mediology in English so far have been found in two short book reviews and one article.  The first, by the screenwriter Yvette Bíró (Wide Angle magazine, Vol.18, No.1, January 1996), was a four-page book review of Debray's Vie et Mort de l'Image, in which she claimed to have discerned "traces of a strong, vulgar Marxist school of thought".

The second review, by Pramod Nayor of the University of Hyderabad (Journal for Cultural and Religious Theory, Vol.8, No.1, Winter 2006) was a review of the English translation of Transmitting Culture (2004).  In concluding the review Nayor notes the similarities of some aspects and directions of mediology to Birmingham School cultural studies ranging from "Raymond Williams through Stuart Hall". Nayor also notes that recent philosophers and historians of science - he cites Bruno Latour, Eugene Thacker and Dwight Atkinson - have also examined science in relation to "intersecting cultural, ethnic, economic and iconographic 'bases' of the transmission of culture"

An article by Steven Maris in Fibreculture No.12  similarly suggests that Debray is too firmly embedded in "the French academic scene" and that thus "Debray's explicit engagement with other national scholarly traditions of media, communications and cultural studies in the works mentioned above is minimal". Maris also notes that mediology "predates much of the [current academic] interest in networked cultures and new media".

Physicists Alan Sokal and Jean Bricmont have criticized Debray's work for using Gödel's theorem as a metaphor without understanding its basic ideas, in their book Fashionable Nonsense. Debray engaged in dialogue with Bricmont in a 2003 book titled "À l'ombre des lumières : Débat entre un philosophe et un scientifique", which so far has not been translated into English.

Despite such criticisms, the six-volume New Dictionary of the History of Ideas (2004) wrote of Debray that "His achievement is to have synthesized these earlier arguments into a practice with a powerful political project ahead of it." (Vol.4, page 1394).

See also
Communication studies
Walter Benjamin
History of technology
History of ideas
Memes
Memetics
Cultural behavior
Cultural selection theory
Cultural reproduction
Evolutionary epistemology
Tipping point (sociology)
Taste (sociology)
Diffusion of innovations

Notes

External links
 The French revue of mediology MediuM (mostly in French, some English).
 "On Transmission: A Metamethodological Analysis (after Régis Debray)" by Steven Maras, University of Sydney.  FibreCulture issue 12.
 Interview with Debray
 Régis Debray's website
 Louise Merzeau (French mediologist)
 François-Bernard Huyghe (French mediologist)
 Forum Mediologie (Germany)

Aesthetics
Communication
Memetics